James Ivar Rostberg (born May 28, 1956) is an American Republican politician from Isanti in the state of Minnesota. He served in the Minnesota House of Representatives as the State Representative from Isanti.

He was arrested and charged with fondling the breast of a 13 year old girl and arrested for sexual contact. He admitted his actions and was ordered to make a full admission in juvenile court of the elements of the charged offense.  At that time, Rostberg agreed not to run for reelection. The case was then dismissed and the files sealed. (2000)

References

Republican Party members of the Minnesota House of Representatives
1956 births
Living people